The 2007 Bank of the West Classic was a women's tennis tournament played on outdoor hard courts. It was the 36th edition of the Bank of the West Classic, and was part of the Tier II Series of the 2007 WTA Tour. It took place at the Taube Tennis Center in Stanford, California, United States, from July 23 through July 29, 2007.

Finals

Singles

 Anna Chakvetadze defeated  Sania Mirza, 6–3, 6–2
It was Chakvetadze's fourth title of the year and the sixth of her career.

Doubles

 Sania Mirza /  Shahar Pe'er defeated  Victoria Azarenka /  Anna Chakvetadze, 6–4, 7–6(7–5)

External links
Official website
Singles, Doubles and Qualifying Singles draws

Bank of the West Classic
Silicon Valley Classic
Bank of the West Classic
Bank of the West Classic
Bank of the West Classic